Go-oo (also Go-Open Office; previously called ooo-build) is a discontinued free office suite which started as a set of patches for OpenOffice.org, then later became an independent fork of OpenOffice.org with a number of enhancements, sponsored by Novell.

ooo-build was started in 2003. The go-oo.org domain name was being used by 2005. The first separate release of Go-oo was 2.3.0, in October 2007. Go-oo was discontinued in favour of LibreOffice in September 2010.

Go-oo had better support for the Microsoft Office OOXML file formats than OpenOffice.org, including write support, as well as other enhancements that had not been accepted upstream.  Many free software advocates worried that Go-oo was a Novell effort to incorporate Microsoft technologies that might be vulnerable to patent claims, and that the effort legitimized OOXML which harmed actual document compatibility. The hybrid PDF export (PDF that includes original source documents), Sun Presentation Minimizer, and other functionalities were directly available in Go-oo.  Later analysis of Novell's contract with Microsoft show that Go-oo feature compatibility was intentionally limited.  LibreOffice in later distributions, like Debian Stretch, use Java instead of Mono (software).

The package branded "OpenOffice.org" in many popular Linux distributions was in fact Go-oo, not the upstream OpenOffice.org code.

History 
The ooo-build patchset was started at Ximian in 2003, before that company was bought by Novell. This was originally because Sun was slow to accept outside patches to OpenOffice.org, even from corporate partners. Most Linux distributions used ooo-build rather than OpenOffice.org upstream code directly.

Since the end of 2007, various Linux distributions, including SUSE in its various forms, Debian and Ubuntu, had cooperated in maintaining Go-oo  as a large set of patches to the upstream OpenOffice.org that, for various technical or bureaucratic reasons, had not been accepted (or, in some cases, even submitted) upstream. Others also offered Windows builds based on Go-oo, e.g. OxygenOffice Professional and OpenOffice.org Novell Edition.

Michael Meeks, from Novell (who also worked on OpenOffice.org and GNOME), said that the differentiation was done because Sun Microsystems wanted to preserve the right to sell the code on a proprietary basis, as they did for IBM Lotus Symphony. Sun was accused of not accepting contributions from the community. Go-oo encouraged outside contributions, with rules similar to those later adopted for LibreOffice.

In September 2010, The Document Foundation announced LibreOffice as a fully separate fork of OpenOffice.org. Go-oo was deprecated in favour of LibreOffice and Go-oo changes were incorporated into LibreOffice. LibreOffice and Collabora Online are current descendants of Go-oo.

Versions 
Stable builds of Go-oo were usually available a couple of days after OpenOffice.org stable builds. Windows builds had a different last number in the version's number than Linux builds. A stable version for Macintosh computers was available.

Differences between OpenOffice.org and Go-oo

Advantages 
 Go-oo works faster in some operations than OpenOffice.org. This makes it perform faster than OpenOffice.org.
 The OpenOffice.org 3.0 installation no longer includes a large number of dictionaries for writing aids (spell checker, hyphenation and thesaurus), as this impacted application performance. Localised releases may include dictionaries for particular primary and secondary languages. Dictionaries are now available as downloadable extensions, separately for each language. Go-oo installation from version 3 on includes dictionaries in many languages, as a single extension, being a part of installation files. Inclusion of a large number of dictionaries in a default installation may affect performance.
 Better Chinese font rendering.

Features 
 Go-oo includes 3-D transition effects in Presentations (Linux).
 Use of the GStreamer multimedia framework in Linux for multimedia content;
 Go-oo uses a combo box in place of the zoom button in stock OpenOffice.org. Newer OOo 2.x feature releases have a clickable status bar item for a zoom menu. A zoom slider was introduced to OOo 3.0 Writer and later added to OOo 3.1 Calc, Impress and Draw components.
 Go-oo Calc 2.4.x has a built in function called "Solver". It is a little different from the Solver function of the same name, which is available from OpenOffice.org 3.0. OpenOffice.org 2.4.x has no Solver.

Filetype support 
 Go-oo can write OOXML files, and not just read them.
Import
 Go-oo 2.4.x has built in support for opening Office Open XML files and brings this function also for Windows 98/ME users. (Note: OpenOffice.org 3.x has built in support for opening Office Open XML documents, but those versions of OOo cannot be installed under Windows 98/ME.)
 VBA macro support;
 Microsoft Works filetype import;
 Lotus Word Pro import;
 Go-oo Draw has built-in functionality to open SVG files. OpenOffice Draw requires an extension.
 The PDF Import extension is included by default in Go-oo 3.0.
 Improved EMF drawing;
 WordPerfect Graphics import.

Save/Export
 From version 3.0 on, Go-oo can save password-protected XLS files. It uses only one basic encryption method compatible with many spreadsheet applications (for example Gnumeric).
 Go-oo 3.x can save Office Open XML files such as docx, xlsx, pptx by using Novell OpenXML Converter. Because Go-oo for Windows and OpenOffice.org Novell Edition for Windows are similar, Novell OpenXML Converter can work with Go-oo 3.x.

Disadvantages 
 Go-oo localizations are available only as language packs to the English installation. Translations of the user interface and dictionaries for different languages in Go-oo are in some cases not the same as in OpenOffice.org.

Other differences 
 Go-oo uses "Tango style" application shortcut icons, quick launch icons and icons for associated files.
 Go-oo installation files were usually available for download a couple of days after OpenOffice.org builds were released.
 Go-oo for Windows was similar to OpenOffice.org Novell Edition for Windows. For example, Go-oo has version 3.0-19 and Novell Edition 3.0-22.
 The first time OpenOffice.org is started, a wizard opens to guide a user through the setting of user name and the registration process. This wizard is disabled in Go-oo.

See also 

 List of word processors
 Comparison of word processors
 Office Open XML software
 OpenDocument software

References

External links 
 Last version of go-oo.org 

Open-source office suites
Office suites for macOS
Unix software
Office suites for Windows
Formerly proprietary software
Free PDF software
Free software programmed in C++
Portable software
OpenOffice
Office suites